Thomas John "T. J." Lang (born September 20, 1987) is a former American football guard. He played college football at Eastern Michigan and was drafted by the Green Bay Packers in the fourth round of the 2009 NFL Draft. Lang was a member of the Packers' Super Bowl XLV win over the Pittsburgh Steelers, and has also played for the Detroit Lions.

Early years
Lang was born in Royal Oak, Michigan. He attended Lakeland High School in White Lake, Michigan before transferring to Brother Rice High School in Birmingham, Michigan. He played on both the offensive and defensive line. As a senior, he had 59 tackles, 8.5 sacks, and one fumble recovery on defense.

College career
T. J. Lang attended Eastern Michigan University. As a freshman, Lang played in all 11 games as a defensive lineman, recording 11 tackles, in the 2005 season. As a sophomore in 2006 Lang moved to offensive tackle and started all 36 games over the next three years.

Professional career

Green Bay Packers 

Lang was selected in the fourth round (109th overall) by the Green Bay Packers in the 2009 NFL Draft. On July 7, 2009, he signed a contract with the Packers. Lang started his first game at the left tackle position versus the Cleveland Browns due to an injury to Chad Clifton.

On August 14, 2012, Lang signed a four-year contract extension with the Packers worth $20.8 million and a $5.5 million signing bonus through the 2016 season.

For his play during the 2016 season, Lang earned his first Pro Bowl appearance in the 2017 Pro Bowl.

Detroit Lions
On March 12, 2017, Lang signed a three-year contract with the Detroit Lions. He started 13 games at right guard in his first season in Detroit, on his way to his second Pro Bowl.

In 2018, Lang started six games at right guard, missing three games due to head, back, and neck injuries, before being placed on injured reserve on November 14, 2018.

On March 8, 2019, Lang was released by the Lions.

On March 29, 2019, Lang announced his retirement from the NFL.

Broadcasting career
Lang joined the Detroit Lions Radio Network as a sideline reporter beginning in the 2021 season.

Personal life
Lang appeared in the movie Pitch Perfect 2 with a group of then-teammates.

References

External links

 Green Bay Packers bio
 Eastern Michigan Eagles bio
 

1987 births
Living people
Players of American football from Michigan
Sportspeople from Royal Oak, Michigan
People from Birmingham, Michigan
American football offensive tackles
American football offensive guards
Eastern Michigan Eagles football players
Green Bay Packers players
Detroit Lions players
National Conference Pro Bowl players
Detroit Lions announcers
Ed Block Courage Award recipients